Fred H. Madden Jr. (born March 30, 1954) is an American Democratic Party politician, who has represented the 4th Legislative District in the New Jersey Senate since taking office on January 13, 2004.

Madden announced in March 2023 that he will not be running for re-election and will continue to serve until his term ends in January 2024.

Early life and education 
Madden is a 1972 graduate of Gloucester Catholic High School. Madden earned a degree in law enforcement from Camden County College, graduated with a B.A. from Glassboro State College (now Rowan College of South Jersey) in law / justice and was awarded an M.S. from Saint Joseph's University in criminal justice.

Madden served as acting superintendent of the New Jersey State Police in 2002, after rising through the ranks from trooper to lieutenant colonel. After he retired from the State Police force in 2002, he worked as the chief of investigations in the Gloucester County Prosecutor's Office.
Madden received training at the FBI Academy and the United States Secret Service Dignitary Protection School.  Under Madden's command, the New Jersey State Police established its Internet sex offender registry, a computer crimes initiative to combat identity theft and Internet crimes against children, and he served as a member of New Jersey's State Domestic Preparedness Task Force to address issues of homeland security and counter-terrorism.

Madden has taught as an adjunct professor at Seton Hall University, Rutgers University and Gloucester County College.

New Jersey Senate 
The Washington Township (Gloucester County) native was recruited to run for the Senate in the high-profile 4th Legislative District against incumbent Republican Senator George Geist in 2004. At the time, the campaign between Madden and Geist was the most expensive in New Jersey State Senate history reaching over $4.2 million, breaking the previous record spending of $1.8 million. After a recount, Madden held on to win with a 63-vote margin.
Senator Madden was instrumental in passing the One-Gun-Month Bill, S1774.  Madden, who previously voted "no" and committed to hold firm in that position in support of the constitutional right to keep and bear arms, switched his vote at the last minute and voted "yes" to limit firearms sales to one per month.

Committee assignments 
In the current session, committee assignments are:
Labor (as Chair)
Health, Human Services and Senior Citizens (as Vice-Chair)
Judiciary

District 4 
Each of the 40 districts in the New Jersey Legislature has one representative in the New Jersey Senate and two members in the New Jersey General Assembly. The representatives from the 4th District for the 2022—2023 Legislative Session are:
Senator Fred H. Madden (D) 
Assemblyman Paul D. Moriarty  (D) 
Assemblywoman Gabriela Mosquera  (D)

Electoral history

New Jersey Senate

References

External links 

Senator Madden's legislative web page, New Jersey Legislature
New Jersey Legislature financial disclosure forms
2018 2017 2016 2015 2014 2013 2012 2011 2010 2009 2008 2007 2006 2005 2004
Madden, Moriarty and Love Legislative website
New Jersey Senate Democrats Website Biography
New Jersey Voter Information Website 2003

1954 births
Living people
American state police officers
Camden County College alumni
Gloucester Catholic High School alumni
Democratic Party New Jersey state senators
People from Washington Township, Gloucester County, New Jersey
Politicians from Gloucester County, New Jersey
Rowan University alumni
Rutgers University faculty
Saint Joseph's University alumni
Seton Hall University faculty
Sex offender registration
21st-century American politicians